Ryan Harrison and Michael Venus were the defending champions, but Harrison chose not to participate this year. Venus played alongside Raven Klaasen, but lost in the first round to Alex de Minaur and Lleyton Hewitt.

Kyle Edmund and Cameron Norrie won the title, defeating Wesley Koolhof and Artem Sitak in the final, 6–4, 6–2.

Seeds

Draw

Draw

References

External Links
 Main Draw

Doubles